The Nissan Skyline RS Silhouette Formula is a Group 5 race car, designed, developed and built by Nissan, for sports car racing, in 1982.

References

Nissan racing cars
Rear-wheel-drive vehicles